The Summer Reading Challenge is an educational competition held annually in the UK by The Reading Agency. It first began in 1999 with the intention of encouraging primary school children to read books during the summer holiday. Participants are awarded stickers and medals based on the competition's theme per tier. Materials are available in large print with supplementary information in Braille.

In an Impact Research study for the Summer Reading Challenge, the Reading Agency found that the Challenge contributed to stemming the 'summer holiday dip' in children's reading achievement.

How it works 
The child first asks for registration at the library desk with their library card in their hand. They then receive the Summer Reading Challenge Sheet where they track their progress and add stickers to complete the challenge. They read two books at a time from the library, record them on their sheet then show the sheet to the librarian where they get two stickers to put on their sheet (one often being a scratch-n'-sniff). After they have collected all the stickers and read their six books, they receive a medal and a certificate.

Resources 
In Wales, most items are available in bilingual Welsh-English versions.

In Scotland, the Summer Reading Challenge is sponsored by Tesco Bank.
 
The Summer Reading Challenge is also run beyond UK, in Eire and  through the British Council’s teaching and learning services .

An interactive website for children is available year-round. Here they can create a profile, chat about books, and get help on what to read next  via the digital Book Sorter . This Book Sorter functionality already offers over 300,000 peer to peer children’s book recommendations in child-friendly categories, added by children themselves, who have read these titles in a Summer Reading Challenge or other activity.

Themes

Opportunities 

Libraries work closely with schools, and each year library staff promote the Challenge to schools in the summer term. Invitations are provided for children to take home to encourage families to take part. Book display by Cambridge Central Library, Cambridge, UK.

For young people (aged 13 to 24) there is the opportunity to volunteer in libraries during the Summer Reading Challenge each year to support younger children taking part. 

This volunteering provides a quality workplace experience for young people in libraries, inspires them to think about future careers and increases their employability as they gain useful life skills and confidence. 8,000 young people are expected to volunteer in the 2015 Summer Reading Challenge. Many go on to volunteer to support other library initiatives throughout the year.

References

Children's literature organizations
Early childhood education materials
Recurring events established in 1999
Organizations promoting literacy
Children's arts organizations